Maunawili is a residential census-designated place (CDP) in the City & County of Honolulu, Koolaupoko District, Island of Oahu, Hawaii, United States.  As of the 2020 census, the CDP had a population of 2,026. Situated mauka (inland or mountain side) of Kalanianaole Highway between Castle Junction and Castle Hospital, Maunawili is nearly all private homes, schools, and a few churches; horse stables complete the rural setting. There are no commercial establishments. However, residents are only minutes (by car or bus) from Kailua.

Maunawili Valley extends behind the prominent windward peak known as Olomana. The residential developments extend only part way back into the valley, which is quite large and fairly wet, supporting limited agriculture (mostly banana growing) behind the housing.  Water from the numerous streams is diverted by a ditch to much drier Waimānalo to support agricultural activities there.

A golf course and agricultural research station (HSPA) are located in the valley. The agriculture research station is also home to a sugar cane, coffee and cacao breeding program.  An attraction of increasing popularity is the Maunawili Demonstration Trail, a state-maintained trail that traverses the breadth of upper Maunawili Valley from the Pali Highway (access at the "Horseshoe Curve") to Waimānalo.  A connecting side trail (Maunawili Falls Trail) is accessible from the neighborhood in upper Maunawili.

The U.S. postal code for Maunawili is the same as for Kailua: 96734.

Geography 
Maunawili is located at  (21.376650, -157.760166).  Lying adjacent to Maunawili is the community of Kailua.

Demographics 

As of the census of 2000, there were 4,869 people, 1,458 households, and 1,224 families residing in the CDP. The racial makeup of the CDP was 36.62% White, 0.55% Black or African American, 0.08% Native American, 28.47% Asian, 8.79% Pacific Islander, 0.55% from other races, and 24.93% from two or more races.  5.79% of the population were Hispanic or Latino of any race.

There were 1,458 households, out of which 31.7% had children under the age of 18 living with them, 68.7% were married couples living together, 11.1% had a female householder with no husband present, and 16.0% were non-families. 11.1% of all households were made up of individuals, and 5.8% had someone living alone who was 65 years of age or older.  The average household size was 3.10 and the average family size 3.31.

In the CDP the population was spread out, with 23.0% under the age of 18, 6.1% from 18 to 24, 27.7% from 25 to 44, 26.9% from 45 to 64, and 16.2% who were 65 years of age or older.  The median age was 41 years.  For every 100 females, there were 89.2 males.  For every 100 females age 18 and over, there were just 83.6 males.

The median income for a household in the CDP was $82,148, and the median income for a family was $84,294. Males had a median income of $51,078 versus $36,324 for females. The per capita income for the CDP was $30,551.  2.5% of the population and 1.5% of families were below the poverty line.  Out of the total population, 3.6% of those under the age of 18 and 2.3% of those 65 and older were living below the poverty line.

Government and infrastructure
The Hawaii Department of Public Safety operates the Women's Community Correctional Center in what was the Maunawili CDP as of the 2000 U.S. Census. The Hawaii Department of Human Services's Hawaii Youth Correctional Facility (HYCF) was located in Maunawili CDP as of 2000. As of the 2010 U.S. Census these places are defined to be in the Kailua CDP.

Education
Hawaii Department of Education operates public schools. Maunawilli Elementary School and Kailua High School were located in the 2000 Maunawili CDP. As of 2010 they are defined to be in the Kailua CDP.

See also

Hoʻokuaʻāina

References

Census-designated places in Honolulu County, Hawaii
Populated places on Oahu